Mahmud Ismayil oghlu Aliyev ( (February 22, 1908 - September 24, 1958) was an Azerbaijani politician and diplomat.

Early life
Aliyev was born on February 22, 1908, in Shamakhi, Azerbaijan. In 1926, he completed his secondary education in Baku, and in 1931 he graduated from Azerbaijan State Medical University with a degree in General Therapy. In 1931–1936, he was director of a clinic in Kalbajar and Jabrayil rayons of Azerbaijan and head surgeon of a regional hospital. In 1938 he was admitted to the ranks of the Communist Party of the Soviet Union.

Political career
Starting from 1937 through 1943, Aliyev headed the Department of Medical Education of Commissariat of People's Health, was director of Azerbaijan State Medical University and director of Science and Preschool Department of Central Committee of Azerbaijan Communist Party. In 1943, Mahmud Aliyev was the Deputy Commissar of Foreign Affairs of Soviet Union and in 1944, he was appointed the Minister of Foreign Affairs of Azerbaijan SSR. While in the office of foreign service, he also worked as the Rector of Doctors' Qualification Institute of Azerbaijan SSR in 1950–1953. Aliyev also served as deputy in the Supreme Soviet of the Soviet Union and Supreme Soviet of Azerbaijan SSR.

Awards
In 1943, Aliyev was awarded the title of Merited Doctor of Azerbaijan SSR. He has also been awarded with Order of the Red Banner of Labour and other medals.
 
Aliyev died on September 24, 1958. He was laid to rest at the Alley of Honor.

See also
Ministry of Foreign Affairs of Azerbaijan

References

1908 births
1958 deaths
20th-century Azerbaijani physicians
People from Shamakhi
People from Baku Governorate
Azerbaijan Communist Party (1920) politicians
First convocation members of the Soviet of the Union
Ministers of Foreign Affairs of Azerbaijan
Recipients of the Order of the Red Banner of Labour
Soviet diplomats
Azerbaijani diplomats
Azerbaijani atheists
Soviet surgeons